The Samsung Impression (a.k.a. Samsung SGH-A877, SGH-A877, A877) is a slider-style mobile phone manufactured by Samsung Electronics. First announced on March 30, 2009, it was released on April 7, 2009. It was the first phone manufactured for the United States to have an AMOLED touch-screen.

Design
The Samsung Impression SGH-A877 takes on a slider form; featuring a 3.2-inch AMOLED touch screen (240x400 pixels) capable of 256k (256,000) colors. The front of the phone contains the brilliant touch screen, and three bottom buttons; an incoming call accept button, an incoming call reject/hang up button (which doubles as the power button), and a back button. The sides of the phone hold the volume control rocker, the lock button, the quick navigation menu, and the camera button. The top contains the proprietary headset, charger, and USB jack. For text input, the Impression features a backlit full QWERTY slide-out keyboard, a full QWERTY on-screen keyboard, a more common number pad mode, and a handwriting mode designed to use with a stylus. This is one of the quick messaging models available through AT&T.

Features
  AMOLED touch-screen display
 WQVGA display resolution
 3 megapixel digital zoom camera
 Camcorder
 Proprietary headset, charger, and USB jack
 Up to 16 GB microSD memory card slot
 Full HTML Browsing
 Full slide-out QWERTY keyboard
 MP3 Player
 YouTube Capable 
 TouchWiz Widget Bar
 Bluetooth 2.0
 Accelerometer
 Quad-band World phone

Contents
Samsung Impression
SIM Card
Wall Charger 
USB connector 
CD Manual
Start Guide

See Also
Samsung Solstice

References

External links 
 Samsung Impression AT&T Product Page
 CNET Reviews
 Samsung Impression Updates, UnOfficial Forum and user group Website

Samsung mobile phones
Mobile phones introduced in 2012
Slider phones